The North Kapunda Hotel is a pub located in Kapunda, South Australia. The hotel is believed by ghost hunters and tour operators to be "one of the most haunted pubs in Australia".

History 
The hotel was opened in November 1849 as the North Kapunda Arms before being renamed Garland Ox in 1853 and renamed the North Kapunda Hotel three years later in 1856 when it was bought by James Crase who rebuilt it in 1865 before selling it around 1875. The hotel was then named the Sir Sidney Kidman Hotel and eventually renamed to the North Kapunda Hotel in 2010. The pub was the site of the first reading of the Riot Act in South Australia from the hotel’s balcony. It also serves as a venue for Fringe events.

Hauntings 
Ghost hunters claim the pub is "the most haunted pub in Australia" and home to a number of malevolent spirits, drawing tourists to its ghost tours. It is said that a woman was murdered in one of the rooms by a man known as "the man in black". The man in black is believed to be one of four spirits that haunt the premises.

In March 2014, paranormal television series Haunting: Australia investigated the pub.

References 

Hotels in South Australia